This is a list of assets currently owned by Rogers Communications Inc.

Telecommunications

Rogers Cable Division

 Rogers Cable — both a cable television and internet service provider with about 2.25 million television customers, and over 930,000 internet subscribers, primarily in Southern & Eastern Ontario, New Brunswick (except in Sackville), and Newfoundland and Labrador.
 Rogers TV — English-language network of community-oriented channels.
 TV Rogers — French-language network of community-oriented channels.
Source Cable — cable service in Hamilton, Ontario
Sportsnet PPV — Pay-per-view service
CPAC (41.58%) — specialty channel

Rogers Internet Division
Rogers Hi-Speed Internet
Rogers Telecom
 Rogers Home Phone Service

Rogers Wireless Division
Rogers Wireless
Rogers Hotspots — WiFi hotspot service installed in venues across Canada
Fido Solutions
Chatr

Retail 
Rogers Plus

Rogers Sports & Media

Conventional television
Citytv
CITY - Toronto, Ontario (First aired 1972)
CKVU - Vancouver, British Columbia (owned & operated since 2002)
CKAL - Calgary, Alberta (O&O since 2005)
CKEM - Edmonton, Alberta (O&O since 2005) 
CHMI - Winnipeg, Manitoba (O&O since 2005) 
Citytv Saskatchewan - Regina & Saskatoon, Saskatchewan (O&O since 2012)
CJNT - Montreal, Quebec (O&O since 2012)
OMNI Television
CFMT - Toronto, Ontario (First aired 1979)
CJMT - Toronto, Ontario (O&O since 2002)
CHNM - Vancouver, British Columbia (O&O since 2008)
CJCO - Calgary, Alberta (O&O since 2008)
CJEO - Edmonton, Alberta (O&O since 2008)
Hockey Night in Canada – Rogers-produced part-time television network airing on CBC Television stations

Specialty and Pay TV
FX Canada (66.64%)
FXX Canada (66.64%)
OLN
Sportsnet
Sportsnet 360
Sportsnet One
Sportsnet World
TSC
WWE Network (Distribution only)

Television production
Dome Productions (50%)

Groupe TVA
Rogers Communications owns 0.03% stake of Groupe TVA

 TVA
 CFTM-DT - Montreal
 CFCM-DT - Quebec City
 CFER-DT - Rimouski
 CHLT-DT - Sherbrooke
 CHEM-DT - Trois-Rivières
 CJPM-DT - Saguenay
 addikTV — film and television series
 Évasion — travel and adventure
 Canal Indigo — PPV movie service
 Le Canal Nouvelles — 24 hour news
 CASA — lifestyle and real estate
 Moi et Ce — lifestyle and entertainment
 Prise 2 — retro film and television series
 TVA Sports — sports
 Yoopa — children's programming
 Zeste — food-related entertainment and lifestyle programming

Radio

Podcasts 
 Frequency Podcast Network
 Pacific Content

Other Assets 
 Rogers Bank
 Rogers Smart Home Monitoring

Sports Teams
 Maple Leaf Sports & Entertainment (37.5%)
 Toronto Maple Leafs
 Toronto Raptors
 Toronto FC
 Toronto Argonauts
 Toronto Marlies
 Raptors 905
 Toronto FC II
 TFC Academy
Toronto Blue Jays

Stadiums
Rogers Centre
Rogers Arena (naming rights only; the building itself is owned by Canucks Sports & Entertainment)
Rogers Place (naming rights only; the building itself is owned by City of Edmonton and operated by Oilers Entertainment Group)

Former Assets
Ignite SmartStream — a streaming platform from Rogers.
Inukshuk Wireless (50%)
Mobilicity — brand retired in 2016, customers moved to Chatr. 
Rogers Publishing — sold to St. Joseph Communications in 2019.
L'actualité médicale
L'actualité pharmaceutique
Canadian Business
Châtelaine
Chatelaine
The Directory of Restaurant & Fast Food Chains
The Directory of Retail Chains
Emballages, Les Nouvelles
Enfants Quebec
Flare
Gestion Santé
glow
glow health
Hello! Canada
LOU LOU (English)
LOU LOU (French)
Maclean's
Mère Nouvelle
Mon Enfant
MoneySense
The National List of Advertisers
Profit
Pure
Québec Pharmacie
Shopping Centre News’s
Today's Parent
Rogers Video — video rental business (although some stores converted into Rogers Plus outlets)
Shomi — video streaming service co-owned with Shaw Communications, shut down in 2016.

See also
List of who owns what

References

Rogers Communications